Parli Assembly constituency (constituency number 233) is a constituency of Maharashtra Vidhan Sabha (legislative assembly) of Maharashtra state in western India.  and a segment of Beed (Lok Sabha constituency) located in the Beed district.

Overview 
The constituency covers entire Parli (परळी) tehsil and part of Ambajogai tehsil.  The number of electors in 2009 were 254,178 (male 133,886, female 120,292). It came into existence in 2008, following the implementation of the delimitation of the legislative assembly constituencies. This constituency covers part of the erstwhile Renapur constituency abolished in 2008.

Members of Legislative Assembly

Election results

Assembly Elections 2019

Assembly Elections 2014

Assembly Elections 2009

See also
 Parli, Maharashtra
 Beed (Lok Sabha constituency)
 Beed District
 List of constituencies of Maharashtra Legislative Assembly

References

Assembly constituencies of Maharashtra
Beed district